Arrow is an American superhero television series developed by Greg Berlanti, Marc Guggenheim, and Andrew Kreisberg based on the DC Comics character Green Arrow, a costumed crime-fighter created by Mort Weisinger and George Papp, and is set in the Arrowverse, sharing continuity with other related television series.

Arrow follows billionaire playboy Oliver Queen (Stephen Amell), who claimed to have spent five years shipwrecked on Lian Yu, a mysterious island in the North China Sea, before returning home to Starling City (later renamed "Star City") to fight crime and corruption as a secret vigilante whose weapon of choice is a bow and arrow. Throughout the series, Oliver is joined by others in his quest, among them former soldier John Diggle (David Ramsey), I.T. expert and skilled hacker Felicity Smoak (Emily Bett Rickards), former assassin Sara Lance (Caity Lotz), aspiring vigilante Roy Harper (Colton Haynes), Oliver's sister Thea (Willa Holland), and attorney-turned-vigilante Laurel Lance (Katie Cassidy). The group also receives support from Laurel and Sara's father, Detective Quentin Lance (Paul Blackthorne). During the first five seasons of the show, characters from Oliver's past appear in a separate story arc based on Oliver's flashbacks, which highlight parallels from Oliver's history that shape events in the main story. Starting with season seven, a series of flash-forwards focus on Oliver's children William (Ben Lewis) and Mia (Katherine McNamara), exploring how present events would affect their future and Green Arrow's legacy.

 All eight seasons of the series have also been released on DVD to regions 1, 2 and 4 and on Blu-ray to regions A and B.

Series overview

Episodes

Season 1 (2012–13)

Season 2 (2013–14)

Season 3 (2014–15)

Season 4 (2015–16)

Season 5 (2016–17)

Season 6 (2017–18)

Season 7 (2018–19)

Season 8 (2019–20)

Specials

Home media

References

External links 

 
 
 List of Arrow episodes at The Futon Critic

 
Lists of American action television series episodes
Lists of American crime drama television series episodes
Lists of American fantasy television series episodes
Lists of American science fiction television series episodes
Lists of Arrowverse episodes